Shorea geniculata is a species of plant in the family Dipterocarpaceae. It is endemic to Borneo.

See also
List of Shorea species

References

geniculata
Endemic flora of Borneo
Trees of Borneo
Taxonomy articles created by Polbot